BC-3, BC.3, BC 3, BC3 or variant may refer to:
 Vultee BT-13 Valiant
 3 BC, the year
 BC3, the IAU Minor Planet Center nomenclature for small solar system bodies
 1982 BC3,  2674 Pandarus
 1997 BC3, a.k.a. 22467 Koharumi
 BC3, boccia classification
 Butler County Community College (Pennsylvania)
 Brilliance BC3
 BC-3, 3-pin bayonet mount for light bulbs in the UK